

Men's Single

Seeds

Qualifiers

Qualifying draw

First qualifier

Second qualifier

Third qualifier

Fourth qualifier

Women's Single

Seeds

Qualifiers

Qualifying draw

First qualifier

Second qualifier

Third qualifier

Fourth qualifier

Men's doubles

Seeds

Qualifiers

Qualifying draw

First qualifier

Second qualifier

Third qualifier

Fourth qualifier

Women's doubles

Seeds

Qualifiers

Qualifying draw

First qualifier

Second qualifier

Third qualifier

Fourth qualifier

Mixed doubles

Seeds

Qualifying draw

First qualifier

Second qualifier

Third qualifier

Fourth qualifier

External links
Draws

All England Open Badminton Championships
All England Super Series Premier - Qualification
All England Premier - Qualification
Sports competitions in Birmingham, West Midlands